Wynton Learson Marsalis (born October 18, 1961) is an American trumpeter, composer, teacher, and artistic director of Jazz at Lincoln Center. He has promoted classical and jazz music, often to young audiences. Marsalis has won nine Grammy Awards, and his Blood on the Fields was the first jazz composition to win the Pulitzer Prize for Music. He is the only musician to win a Grammy Award in both jazz and classical during the same year.

Early years
Marsalis was born in New Orleans, Louisiana, on October 18, 1961, and grew up in the suburb of Kenner. He is the second of six sons born to Dolores Ferdinand Marsalis and Ellis Marsalis Jr., a pianist and music teacher. He was named after jazz pianist Wynton Kelly.  Branford Marsalis is his older brother and Jason Marsalis and Delfeayo Marsalis are younger. All three are jazz musicians. While sitting at a table with trumpeters Al Hirt, Miles Davis, and Clark Terry, his father jokingly suggested that he might as well get Wynton a trumpet, too. Hirt volunteered to give him one, so at the age of six Marsalis received his first trumpet.

Although he owned a trumpet when he was six, he did not practice much until he was 12. He attended Benjamin Franklin High School and the New Orleans Center for Creative Arts. He studied classical music at school and jazz at home with his father. He played in funk bands and a marching band led by Danny Barker. He performed on trumpet publicly as the only black musician in the New Orleans Civic Orchestra. After winning a music contest at fourteen, he performed Joseph Haydn's trumpet concerto with the New Orleans Philharmonic. Two years later he performed Brandenburg Concerto No. 2 in F Major by Bach. At seventeen, he was one of the youngest musicians admitted to Tanglewood Music Center.

Career

In 1979, he moved to New York City to attend the Juilliard School for a Bachelor of Music in trumpet performance, leaving before graduating in 1981. He intended to pursue a career in classical music. In 1980, he toured Europe as a member of the Art Blakey big band, becoming a member of The Jazz Messengers and remaining with Blakey until 1982. He changed his mind about his career and turned to jazz. He has said that years of playing with Blakey influenced his decision. He recorded for the first time with Blakey and one year later he went on tour with Herbie Hancock. After signing a contract with Columbia, he recorded his first solo album. In 1982, he established a quintet with his brother Branford Marsalis, Kenny Kirkland, Charnett Moffett, and Jeff "Tain" Watts. When Branford and Kenny Kirkland left three years later to record and tour with Sting, Marsalis formed another quartet, this time with Marcus Roberts on piano, Robert Hurst on double bass, and Watts on drums. After a while, the band expanded to include Wessell Anderson, Wycliffe Gordon, Eric Reed, Herlin Riley, Reginald Veal, and Todd Williams.

When asked about influences on his playing style, he cites Duke Ellington, Miles Davis, Harry Sweets Edison, Clark Terry, Dizzy Gillespie, Jelly Roll Morton, Charlie Parker, Wayne Shorter, Thelonious Monk, Cootie Williams, Ray Nance, Maurice André, and Adolph Hofner. Other influences include Clifford Brown, Freddie Hubbard, and Adolph Herseth.

Marsalis has established himself as a lecturer and musical ambassador, having spoken and performed on every continent except Antarctica.

Jazz at Lincoln Center

In 1987, Marsalis helped start the Classical Jazz summer concert series at Lincoln Center in New York City. The success of the series led to Jazz at Lincoln Center becoming a department at Lincoln Center, then to becoming an independent entity in 1996 alongside organizations such as the New York Philharmonic and the Metropolitan Opera. Marsalis became artistic director of the center and the musical director of the band, the Jazz at Lincoln Center Orchestra. The orchestra performs at its home venue, Rose Hall, goes on tour, visits schools, appears on radio and television, and produces albums through its label, Blue Engine Records.

In 2011, Marsalis and rock guitarist Eric Clapton performed together in a Jazz at Lincoln Center concert. The concert was recorded and released as the album Play the Blues: Live from Jazz at Lincoln Center.

Other work
In 1986, Marsalis guest starred in an episode of Sesame Street.

In 1995, he hosted the educational program Marsalis on Music on public television, while during the same year National Public Radio broadcast his series Making the Music. Both programs won the George Foster Peabody Award, the highest award given in journalism.

In December 2011, Marsalis was named cultural correspondent for CBS This Morning. He is a member of the CuriosityStream Advisory Board. He serves as director of the Juilliard Jazz Studies program. In 2015, Cornell University appointed him A.D. White Professor-at-Large.

In addition to Jazz at Lincoln Center, Marsalis has also worked with the Philadelphia Orchestra as a composer for modern classical music.  The orchestra premiered a Violin Concerto he composed in 2015, and a Tuba Concerto of his in 2021.

Marsalis was involved in writing, arranging, and performing music for the 2019 Daniel Pritzker film Bolden.

Debate on jazz
Marsalis is generally associated with straight-ahead jazz, jazz that kept to the original instruments used in jazz and eschewed electronica that gained prominence in the 70s and 80s.  In The Jazz Book, the authors list what Marsalis considers to be the fundamentals of jazz: blues, standards, a swing beat, tonality, harmony, craftsmanship, and mastery of the tradition beginning with New Orleans jazz up to Ornette Coleman. Jazz critic Scott Yanow regards Marsalis as talented but criticizes his "selective knowledge of jazz history" and has said Marsalis considers "post-1965 avant-garde playing to be outside of jazz and 1970s fusion to be barren" and the unfortunate result of the "somewhat eccentric beliefs of Stanley Crouch". In The New York Times in 1997, pianist Keith Jarrett said Marsalis "imitates other people's styles too well ... His music sounds like a high school trumpet player to me".

Bassist Stanley Clarke said, "All the guys that are criticizing—like Wynton Marsalis and those guys—I would hate to be around to hear those guys playing on top of a groove!" But Clarke also said, "These things I've said about Wynton are my criticism of him, but the positive things I have to say about him outweigh the negative. He has brought respectability back to jazz."

When he met Miles Davis, one of his idols, Davis said, "So here's the police ...". For his part, Marsalis compared Miles Davis's embrace of rock and pop music (most notably in his 1970 album Bitches Brew) to "a general who has betrayed his country." Marsalis has called rap "hormone driven pop music" and said that hip hop "reinforces destructive behavior at home and influences the world's view of the Afro American in a decidedly negative direction."

Marsalis responded to criticism by saying, "You can't enter a battle and expect not to get hurt." He has said that losing the freedom to criticize is "to accept mob rule, it is a step back towards slavery."

Personal life
Marsalis is the son of the late jazz musician Ellis Marsalis Jr. (pianist), grandson of Ellis Marsalis Sr., and brother of Branford (saxophonist), Delfeayo (trombonist and producer), and Jason (drummer). Marsalis's son, Jasper Armstrong Marsalis, is a music producer known professionally as Slauson Malone.

Marsalis was raised Catholic.

Awards and honors

In 1983, at the age of 22, he became the only musician to win Grammy Awards in jazz and classical music during the same year. At the award ceremonies the next year, he won again in both categories.

After his first album came out in 1982, Marsalis won polls in DownBeat magazine for Musician of the Year, Best Trumpeter, and Album of the Year. In 2017, he was one of the youngest members to be inducted into the DownBeat Hall of Fame.

In 1997, he became the first jazz musician to win the Pulitzer Prize for Music for his oratorio Blood on the Fields. In a note to him, Zarin Mehta wrote, "I was not surprised at your winning the Pulitzer Prize for Blood on the Fields. It is a broad, beautifully painted canvas that impresses and inspires. It speaks to us all...I'm sure that, somewhere in the firmament, Buddy Bolden, Louis Armstrong and legions of others are smiling down on you."

Wynton Marsalis has won the National Medal of Arts, the National Humanities Medal, and been named an NEA Jazz Master. In 2001, he was also named a UN Messenger of Peace.

Approximately seven million copies of his recordings have been sold worldwide. He has toured in 30 countries and on every continent except Antarctica.

He was given the Louis Armstrong Memorial Medal and the Algur H. Meadows Award for Excellence in the Arts. He was inducted into the American Academy of Achievement and was dubbed an Honorary Dreamer by the I Have a Dream Foundation. The New York Urban League awarded Marsalis the Frederick Douglass Medallion for distinguished leadership. The American Arts Council presented him with the Arts Education Award.

He won the Dutch Edison Award and the French Grand Prix du Disque. The Mayor of Vitoria, Spain, gave him the city's gold medal, its most coveted distinction. In 1996, Britain's senior conservatoire, the Royal Academy of Music, made him an honorary member, the Academy's highest decoration for a non-British citizen. The city of Marciac, France, erected a bronze statue in his honor for the key role he played in the story of the festival. The French Ministry of Culture gave him the rank of Knight in the Order of Arts and Literature. In 2008, he received France's highest distinction, the insignia Chevalier of the Legion of Honour.

He has received honorary degrees from the Frost School of Music at the University of Miami (1994),  University of Scranton (1996), Kenyon College (2019), New York University, Columbia, Connecticut College, Harvard, Howard, Northwestern, Princeton, Vermont, and the State University of New York.

Grammy Awards
Best Jazz Instrumental Solo
 Think of One (1983)
 Hot House Flowers (1984)
 Black Codes (From the Underground) (1985)

Best Jazz Instrumental Album, Individual or Group
 Black Codes (From the Underground) (1985)
 J Mood (1986)
 Marsalis Standard Time, Vol. I (1987)

Best Instrumental Soloist(s) Performance (with orchestra)
 Raymond Leppard (conductor), Wynton Marsalis and the National Philharmonic Orchestra for Haydn: Trumpet Concerto in E Flat/Leopold Mozart: Trumpet Concerto in D/Hummel: Trumpet Concerto in E Flat (1983)
 Raymond Leppard (conductor), Wynton Marsalis and the English Chamber Orchestra for Wynton Marsalis, Edita Gruberova: Handel, Purcell, Torelli, Fasch, Molter (1984)

Best Spoken Word Album for Children
 Listen to the Storytellers (2000)

Discography

Published works
 Sweet Swing Blues on the Road with Frank Stewart (1994)
 Marsalis on Music (1995)
 Jazz in the Bittersweet Blues of Life with Carl Vigeland (2002)
 To a Young Jazz Musician: Letters from the Road with Selwyn Seyfu Hinds (2004)
 Jazz ABZ: An A to Z Collection of Jazz Portraits with Paul Rogers (2007)
 Moving to Higher Ground: How Jazz Can Change Your Life with Geoffrey Ward (2008)
 Squeak, Rumble, Whomp! Whomp! Whomp!: A Sonic Adventure with Paul Rogers (2012)

Further reading
 Le Fabuleux Destin de Marciac (Editions Un autre Reg'art, 2014): a reference book about the French city of Marciac, the "Jazz in Marciac" festival and the key role played by Wynton Marsalis in the story of this festival

References

External links 

 

  – video
 Video interviews by Charlie Rose
 Narrator in the PBS America documentary series Jazz.

1961 births
Living people
20th-century African-American musicians
20th-century American composers
20th-century jazz composers
21st-century American composers
21st-century jazz composers
African-American jazz composers
African-American jazz musicians
African-American music educators
American classical trumpeters
American male jazz composers
American male trumpeters
American jazz bandleaders
American jazz composers
American jazz educators
American jazz trumpeters
Big band bandleaders
Blue Note Records artists
CBS News people
Columbia Records artists
Fairview Baptist Church Marching Band members
Fellows of the American Academy of Arts and Sciences
George Peabody Medal winners
Grammy Award winners
Jazz at Lincoln Center Orchestra members
Jazz musicians from New Orleans
Jazz musicians from New York (state)
Jazz radio presenters
Juilliard School alumni
Post-bop jazz musicians
Pulitzer Prize for Music winners
The Jazz Messengers members
Marsalis family
National Humanities Medal recipients
African-American film score composers